Eastern Westmoreland Career and Technology Center  is a public Career and Technical school, located near Latrobe, Pennsylvania, serving students in grades 10-12 in the eastern portion of Westmoreland County, Pennsylvania.

Participating School Districts
There are three participating High Schools that send students to the center, they are as follows:

 Derry Area High School - of the Derry Area School District
 Greater Latrobe Senior High School - of the Greater Latrobe School District
 Ligonier Valley High School - of the Ligonier Valley School District.

References

External links
 

Schools in Westmoreland County, Pennsylvania
Public high schools in Pennsylvania